Berryville is a town in Henderson County, Texas, United States. The population was 824 at the 2020 census, down from 975 at the 2010 census.

Geography

Berryville is located in the southeast corner of Henderson County at  (32.089594, –95.469093). It is on the west shore of Lake Palestine, on both sides of Cobb Inlet. The southern town border follows the Anderson County line. The town limits extend west to Texas State Highway 155, which leads south  to Frankston and northeast  to Tyler.

Demographics

As of the 2020 United States census, there were 824 people, 493 households, and 376 families residing in the town.

As of the census of 2000, there were 891 people, 355 households, and 263 families residing in the town. The population density was 678.1 people per square mile (262.6/km2). There were 454 housing units at an average density of 345.5 per square mile (133.8/km2). The racial makeup of the town was 93.71% White, 3.59% African American, 1.35% Native American, 0.11% Asian, 0.11% from other races, and 1.12% from two or more races. Hispanic or Latino of any race were 2.81% of the population.

There were 355 households, out of which 29.0% had children under the age of 18 living with them, 59.4% were married couples living together, 11.5% had a female householder with no husband present, and 25.9% were non-families. 22.0% of all households were made up of individuals, and 11.0% had someone living alone who was 65 years of age or older. The average household size was 2.51 and the average family size was 2.92.

In the town, the population was spread out, with 24.2% under the age of 18, 8.2% from 18 to 24, 25.7% from 25 to 44, 25.8% from 45 to 64, and 16.0% who were 65 years of age or older. The median age was 39 years. For every 100 females, there were 105.3 males. For every 100 females age 18 and over, there were 94.0 males.

The median income for a household in the town was $31,618, and the median income for a family was $35,990. Males had a median income of $29,167 versus $19,853 for females. The per capita income for the town was $14,478. About 13.7% of families and 16.4% of the population were below the poverty line, including 25.2% of those under age 18 and 6.9% of those age 65 or over.

Education
Berryville is served by the Frankston Independent School District.

References

External links
 City of Berryville official website
 

Towns in Henderson County, Texas
Towns in Texas